The NOS Primavera Sound 2019 was held on 6 to 8 June 2019 at the Parque da Cidade, Porto, Portugal. The festival was headlined by Solange, Stereolab, J Balvin, Interpol, Erykah Badu, and Rosalía.

Lineup
Headline performers are listed in boldface. Artists listed from latest to earliest set times.

NOS

Seat

Super Bock

Pull & Bear

Primavera Bits

Radio Primavera Sound

References

2019 music festivals
Music festivals in Portugal
Primavera Sound